HIL Limited formerly known as Hyderabad Industries Limited is a group company of CK Birla Group. They are into construction materials, machinery, industrial supplies and components; logistics network
It has two brands - Charminar and Birla Aerocon.

History
It was established in the Princely state of Hyderabad on 17 June 1946 as Hyderabad Asbestos. It was primarily into cement sheets. But was renamed as Hyderabad Industries later.

References

CK Birla Group
Hyderabad State
1946 establishments in India